Tyloderma subpubescens is a species of hidden snout weevil in the beetle family Curculionidae. It is found in North America.

References

Further reading

 
 

Cryptorhynchinae
Beetles of North America
Beetles described in 1892
Taxa named by Thomas Lincoln Casey Jr.
Articles created by Qbugbot